Dobrov Institute for Scientific and Technological Potential and Science History Studies of National Academy of Sciences of Ukraine (STEPS Center of NAS of Ukraine) is a research institute of the National Academy of Sciences of Ukraine.

History

The center's history dates from 1965, with the Department of Machine Methods for Processing of Science History Information at the Institute of History of the Academy of Sciences of the Ukrainian SSR.

In subsequent years, the team of researchers supervised by H.M. Dobrov was doing research in the Institute of Mathematics, Institute of Cybernetics and the Council of Productive Forces of Ukraine of the Academy of Sciences of the Ukrainian SSR.

In 1986-1991 STEPS Center was a functionally independent structural entity in the Institute for Superhard Materials.

In 1989 STEPS Center was named after its founder — H.M. Dobrov, professor, and correspondent-member of the NAS of Ukraine.

In 1991 STEPS Center got the status of a research institute.

Since 1991 STEPS Center has been a scientific research institution within the Informatics Division of NAS of Ukraine.

Directors
 1969 — 1989 Hennadiy Dobrov
 1989 — Borys Malitsky

Main fields of research

Critical review of historic experiences, tendencies and social problems of science development in Ukraine in the global science development context.
Studies in contemporary methods of sociology and methodology of science and innovation research.
Studies on science and technology potential: evaluation, analysis, science and technology policy design and delivery.
Scientometrics and web-metrics studies of science and technology potential.
Studies in contemporary approaches to internationalization and globalization of R&D and innovation.
Foresight and forecasting studies of science, technology and innovation.
Target complex research on the experience, performance, development prospects and the social role of the NAS of Ukraine

Coordination and training

STEPS Сenter coordinates theoretical, methodological and applied research in the above fields conducted in the NAS of Ukraine.
STEPS Сenter has post graduate courses in Economics and National Economy Administration (specialty 08.00.03) and in Science and Technology History (specialty 07.00.07).
STEPS Center hosts two Specialized Scientific Councils in the above specialties to award scientific degrees of Doctor of Sciences and Candidate of Sciences with the 350 successful awards of scientific degrees.

Conferences

Since 1966: biannual Kyiv international symposia on science of science and science & technology forecasting.
Since 1989: annual Dobrov readings in commemoration of Guennady Mikhailovich Dobrov, founder of the Kyiv academic school on science of science, the first director of the center.
Since 2001: international forums sponsored and supported by UNESCO and the International Association of Academies of Sciences.
The center is a co-organizer of annual international conference on innovation policies in Alushta (Crimea), and the organizer of conferences on key issues of R&D and Innovation studies.

International science & technology cooperation

Joint projects performed with research institutions from the EU, the CIS, other countries and international organizations.
Researchers of the center are experts in international programs; members of the European Association of Research and Technologies, the European Association of Evolutionary Economy, the International Union of Scientometrics and Informetrics, the European Research and Education Program; members of editorial boards in scientific journals Education and Science (Bulgaria), Technological Learning, Innovation and Development (Switzerland) and others.
Since 2011, STEPS Center has been the basic organization of National Contact Point of the EU FP7 on research and technological development, on the priority area “Social Sciences and Humanities”.

Publishing

Since 1993 – A quarterly international journal Science and Science of Science (follower of an interdisciplinary collection Science of Science and Informatics, 1970–1993).
Since 1998 – Problems of Science, an interdisciplinary scientific journal (in collaboration with Kyiv State Center for Science & Technology and Economic Information of the Ministry of Education and Science, sports and Youth of Ukraine).
Since 1986 – Essays on Natural Science and Technology History.

Scientific departments

 Department for Science and Technology History, headed by Dr. Yurii Khramov, professor.
 Department for Systemic Studies of Science and Technology Potential, headed by Dr. Oleh Mekh, professor.
 Center for Innovation and Technological Development, headed by Dr. Viacheslav Soloviov, professor.
 Department for Problems of Operation and Development Strategies of the NAS of Ukraine, headed by Dr. Oleh Hrachev.
 Joint Laboratory of the Ministry of Education and Science of Ukraine and the NAS of Ukraine, on the Problems of Design and Implementation of Science and Technology Policy in Ukraine, headed by Dr. Ihor Bulkin.

Administration

 Director: Prof., Dr. Boris Malitsky, Honored figure of science and technology of Ukraine
 Deputy directors: Prof., Dr. Viacheslav Soloviov, Dr. Oleh Kubalskyi, Oleksandr Sosnov, scientific and technical work.
 Research manager: Dr. Anton Koretskyi.

Location
Address: Dobrov Institute for Scientific and Technological Potential and Science History Studies of National Academy of Sciences of Ukraine (STEPS Center of NAS of Ukraine). 60, Tarasa Shevchenko Blvd., Kyiv, Ukraine, 01032.

Links
 Site of Dobrov Institute for Scientific and Technological Potential and Science History Studies of National Academy of Sciences of Ukraine
  journal “Science and Science of Science”
 About Center 2
 About Center 3
 Some editions of center on a site NAUKAINFORM
 Row of reasons about activity of STEPS Center in the anniversary number of international magazine Science and Science of Science

National Academy of Sciences of Ukraine
Research institutes in the Soviet Union
Science and technology in Ukraine
Scientific organizations based in Ukraine
Research institutes in Kyiv
Information technology research institutes